The Coca-Cola Classic was a regular season National Collegiate Athletic Association (NCAA) college football game played in Tokyo, Japan, from 1977 to 1993. It was originally sponsored by Mitsubishi and known as the Mirage Bowl, and later sponsored by The Coca-Cola Company and renamed for the soft drink Coca-Cola Classic. Because the game was merely a re-location of a late regular season game, it was not considered a traditional postseason bowl game.

Corporate sponsorship

Mitsubishi

The Mirage Bowl was hosted by Mitsubishi Motors in Japan from its inception through 1985. The name refers to Mitsubishi's Mirage line of subcompact cars. Chrysler imported the Mirage and sold it in the US as the Dodge Colt and the Plymouth Champ.

Coca-Cola Company

The Coca-Cola Company took over corporate sponsorship from Mitsubishi in 1986, renaming it the "Coca-Cola Classic".  Other sports contests sponsored by Coca-Cola have also been called "Coca-Cola Classic", for example, in college basketball and volleyball.  The company's flagship beverage, itself, was re-branded "Coca-Cola Classic" in the wake of the "New Coke" fiasco.

Game results

Notable games

1977
The inaugural Mirage Bowl was played in 1977 at Korakuen Stadium on December 11, between Grambling and Temple.  Grambling rallied to win 35–32 with a last-minute touchdown, and All-American quarterback Doug Williams was named MVP.

1984
The eighth edition, between Army and Montana, marked the introduction of "The Wave" to Japan.  A line of Army and Montana cheerleaders on the playing field demonstrated the concept of The Wave, and it was quickly adopted by spectators in the stands.

1988

Heisman Trophy winning running back Barry Sanders concluded his Division I-A (now FBS) record-setting rushing season in this game, since the NCAA did not begin counting bowl game statistics until 2002 (four weeks later, he gained 222 yards in the Holiday Bowl, which are not included in his record-setting total).  He watched the Heisman Trophy announcement in a Tokyo television studio at five o'clock in the morning. Sanders rushed for more than 300 yards in Oklahoma State's 45–42 win against Texas Tech to finish the season with 2,628 yards.

1990

Houston quarterback David Klingler passed for 716 yards against Arizona State, a Division I-A (now FBS) single-game passing yardage record that stood for over two decades, broken by Connor Halliday in 2014.

1992
Nebraska won the Big Eight conference title, edging out runner-up Colorado with the win.

1993
With their 21-point win over Michigan State, Wisconsin became co-champions of the Big Ten (with Ohio State, who they had tied earlier in the season) and received the invitation to the Rose Bowl, the program's first New Year's Day appearance in 31 years.

See also
 List of college bowl games
 List of college football games played outside the United States

References

College football games
Defunct college football bowls
American football in Japan
Coca-Cola
Recurring sporting events established in 1977
Recurring sporting events disestablished in 1993
1977 establishments in Japan
1993 disestablishments in Japan